Frederick MacDonald Quayle (February 16, 1936 – November 24, 2018) was an American politician and lawyer.

Political career
Quayle served in the Virginia Senate and was a Republican. Quayle represented the 13th District in the Commonwealth of Virginia. His district included parts of the cities of Chesapeake, Franklin, Hopewell, Portsmouth, Suffolk, all of Surry County and parts of Isle of Wight and Southampton counties. Quayle was first elected in 1991, and was reelected four consecutive times. Quayle sat on the following committees: Courts of Justice, Education and Health, Finance, Rules, and Local Government, for which he is the Chair. In November 2007, Quayle defeated his Democratic opponent, Steve Heretick, by an 18 percent margin. He didn't stand for reelection in 2011 partly due to redistricting.

Early life and education 
Quayle was born in Suffolk, Virginia and graduated from Suffolk High School in 1954. He earned a B.A. in economics at the University of Virginia in 1959, where he was an accomplished lacrosse player and a member of the now defunct Phi Kappa Sigma fraternity.  Quayle studied law at T.C. Williams School of Law at the University of Richmond and earned his LL.B. in 1966.

Personal life
Quayle lived in Suffolk and served in the United States Army Reserves. He also taught Political Science at Old Dominion University in Norfolk, Virginia. He married Brenda Lee Smith in 1977, with whom he had four children. He died on November 24, 2018, from a short illness.

References

External links 
 Official Senate of Virginia Page - Senator Frederick M. Quayle
 RichmondSunlight Legislative Tracking Site
 Senator Frederick M. Quayle Personal Website
 Senate District Outline Maps
Project Vote Smart - Senator Frederick MacDonald Quayle (VA) profile
Follow the Money - Frederick M Quayle
2005 2003 2001 1999 campaign contributions
Washington Post - Senate District 13 Race
 November 6, 2007 Election Results by County/City

1936 births
2018 deaths
Republican Party Virginia state senators
Virginia lawyers
Politicians from Suffolk, Virginia
Military personnel from Virginia
University of Virginia alumni
University of Richmond School of Law alumni
Old Dominion University faculty
21st-century American politicians
20th-century American politicians
20th-century American lawyers